Live in London March 2011 is a 2011 live album studio release from KT Tunstall, featuring tracks from four of her albums and EPs and one cover. It is her fifth live release, fourth live album, and the first live album to be released on CD. It follows the release of Tiger Suit

Release 
The album was released on 8 March 2011 on International Women's Day. It was recorded at the HMV Forum in London, by instant delivery company.

The album features an acoustic track from The Scarlet Tulip EP: "The Hidden Heart", and a cover of The Cure's "Close to Me".

The album was available through her online store, the Abbey Road Live Here Now online store and at her live shows.

Track listing

Disc One

Disc Two

References

KT Tunstall albums
2011 live albums
Albums produced by Steve Osborne
EMI Records live albums